Do Good (1938–1960) was a Quarter Horse mare who was noted for being an outstanding broodmare of race horses. She was inducted into the American Quarter Horse Association's (or AQHA)  Hall of Fame in 2008.

Life

Do Good was bred by Jim Harkey of Carlsbad, New Mexico and was foaled in 1938. She was bought by Frank Vessels Sr. in 1945, and was never raced or shown. She produced 13 foals in her lifetime.

Pedigree

Notes

References

External links
 All Breed Pedigree Database pedigree of Do Good

American Quarter Horse broodmares
1938 racehorse births
1960 racehorse deaths
AQHA Hall of Fame (horses)